The Boonshoft School of Medicine (formerly known as Wright State University School of Medicine) is the medical school at Wright State University. It is located in Dayton, Ohio, and serves the Miami Valley region of southwestern Ohio.

Instead of operating a university-based hospital for clinical training, Wright State is affiliated with five major teaching hospitals in the Greater Dayton area and has formal affiliation agreements with more than 25 other health care institutions in the Miami Valley.

Admission to Wright State University's School of Medicine is competitive among the many students who apply; in 2019, 6,182 students applied for admission to the school, and 119 matriculated.

The Boonshoft School of Medicine is accredited by the Liaison Committee on Medical Education (LCME).

History
In 1972, Congress passed the Veterans Administration Medical School Assistance and Health Manpower Training Act, also known as the Teague Cranston Act, which provided financial support for establishing five new U.S. medical schools, including one at Wright State University. The VA awarded the school a $19.5 million, seven-year grant for faculty support and facilities. Other major founding donors included Mrs. Virginia Kettering, who contributed $1 million in unrestricted funds, and the Fordham Foundation, which provided $500,000 for a medical library. The school was established by the Ohio General Assembly in 1973.

The school's charter class began studies in 1976 and graduated in 1980. Since then, more than 2,820 physicians have graduated from the School of Medicine. Wright State alumni are practicing in almost every state in the nation.

In 2005, the school changed its name to the Wright State University Boonshoft School of Medicine in recognition of the Oscar Boonshoft family, which gave Wright State's largest philanthropic gift to the medical school.

In 2009, the school became the first medical school in the United States to debut its own medical student-produced radio program, dubbed Radio Rounds.

Education

Major teaching affiliates
The school's major teaching affiliates include:

 Dayton Children's Hospital
 Dayton Veterans Affairs Medical Center
 Miami Valley Hospital
 Kettering Medical Center
 Wright-Patterson Medical Center

Apart from the above list, the medical school also has 26 other minor affiliates.

Research
The school houses National Centers of Research Excellence including the National Center for Medical Readiness; the Lifespan Health Research Center, which houses the nation’s largest and oldest study of human growth and development; the Wright State University and Premier Health Partners Neuroscience Institute at Miami Valley Hospital; and the Center for Interventions, Treatment, and Addictions Research. In fall 2007, five researchers associated with the Neuroscience Institute won a prestigious Program Project Grant from the National Institute of Neurological Disorders and Stroke. The $4.8 million grant is the first Program Project Grant Wright State University has received. In the fiscal year of 2010, Wright State University received 610 research awards for a total of $94,111,241. The region’s leader in biomedical research, the Boonshoft School of Medicine received 158 awards for a total of $22,440,827 during that same time period. Federal grants were received from the Department of Health and Human Services and various National Institutes of Health, the Department of Defense, NASA and the Department of Education.

The Department of Community Health at Boonshoft School of Medicine ranks 10th out of 129 accredited M.D.-granting U.S. medical schools for the total amount of research funding it has received from the National Institutes of Health in the area of Public Health and Preventive Medicine.

Degree programs
Along with the traditional MD degree, students can also complete several different dual degree programs. The National Center for Medical Readiness (NCMR), housed at the Boonshoft School of Medicine, is a response organization for large scale emergencies, such as a weather disaster, terrorist attack or hazmat situation. The Center was established by the Wright State University Boonshoft School of Medicine Department of Emergency Medicine and has been certified as a National Disaster Life Support Foundation (NDLSF) Regional Training Center.

Notable faculty

 Siva S. Banda – aerospace engineer
 Kenneth N. Beers – NASA physician
 Mary Anne Frey - NASA physician
 Alireza Marandi – physician
 Jerrold S. Petrofsky – physician
 Charles H. Roadman II – Air Force Surgeon General
 Rosalyn Scott – the first African-American woman to become a thoracic surgeon

Notable alumni
 Mark E. Green – American politician, physician, and retired U.S. Army Major
 Richard Scheuring – NASA Flight surgeon

References

External links

Medical schools in Ohio
Healthcare in Dayton, Ohio
Education in Dayton, Ohio
Medical research institutes in the United States
Research institutes in Ohio